Henryk Rozmiarek (13 January 1949 – 10 March 2021) was a Polish handball player who competed in the 1972 Summer Olympics, in the 1976 Summer Olympics, and in the 1980 Summer Olympics.

In 1972 he was a member of the Polish team which finished tenth. Four years later he won the bronze medal with the Polish team. In 1980 he was part of the Polish team which finished seventh.

References

External links
Profile 

1949 births
2021 deaths
Sportspeople from Poznań
Polish male handball players
Handball players at the 1972 Summer Olympics
Handball players at the 1976 Summer Olympics
Handball players at the 1980 Summer Olympics
Olympic handball players of Poland
Olympic bronze medalists for Poland
Olympic medalists in handball
Medalists at the 1976 Summer Olympics
20th-century Polish people